New European College is a private international business school in Munich, Germany, that offers state-accredited university programs in business administration and international management in English.

History 
Established in 2014, New European College was authorized in 2015 by the Bavarian Ministry of Education, based on the academic agreement (approved by the North Rhine-Westphalian Ministry of Sciences) with the International University Bad Honnef, to hold university courses and examinations.

Accreditation 
All academic degrees offered by New European College are awarded by the International University of Applied Sciences Bad Honnef (IUBH) and have full German state accreditation. The International University of Applied Sciences Bad Honnef is officially recognized in Germany as higher education institution and has the privilege to award academic degrees - undergraduate and graduate. Furthermore IUBH is accredited with the Foundation of International Business Administration Accreditation (FIBAA) and the German Council of Science and Humanities (Wissenschaftsrat).

Academic programs

Preparation Course 
Pathway to Bachelor (Earlier: Foundation of Business) (Studienkolleg)
 One-year preparation program for students not eligible for direct entry to German universities

Undergraduate degrees 
 Bachelor of Arts (B.A.) in International Management - 6 semester program, 180 ECTS
 Specializations:
 Accounting & Finance
 International Marketing
 Human Resource Management

Graduate degrees 
 Master of Arts (M.A.) in International Management - 4 semester program, 120 ECTS
 Specializations:
 International Marketing
 Accounting & Finance
 International Human Resource Management
 Hospitality Management 
 IT Management
 Master of Arts for Non-Business Graduates (M.A) in International Management - 5 semester program, 120 ECTS
 Specializations:
 International Marketing
 Accounting & Finance
 International Human Resource Management
 Hospitality Management 
 IT Management
 Master of Business Administration (MBA) in International Business - 3 semester program, 90 ECTS
Specializations:
 International Marketing
 Accounting & Finance
 Hospitality Management 
 IT Management
 Accelerated Master of Business Administration (MBA) in International Business - 2 semester program, 60 ECTS

Campus 
The NEC Campus is located on the western upper bank of the river Isar in the southern part of Munich. It is 15 minutes away from the city centre of Munich by public transport. Private student dormitories are located in 10 minutes walking distance from the campus.

Job seeker's visa 
Since August 2012 foreign students (non-EU citizenship) can, upon successful completion of their studies at an accredited German university, extend their residence permit for 18 months to seek employment in Germany.

References

External links
 Official website
 MBA program information

Educational institutions established in 2014
Business schools in Germany
Universities and colleges in Munich
2014 establishments in Germany
Private universities and colleges in Germany